Rajinder Singh Rahelu (born 22 July 1973) is an Indian Paralympic powerlifter. He won a bronze medal at the 2004 Summer Paralympics in the 56 kg category. He represented India at the 2008 Summer Paralympics in Beijing, finishing fifth in the final standings.

Personal life
Rahelu was born on 22 July 1973 in Mehsampur village, Jalandhar district, Punjab, in a poor Kashyap rajput family. He is the youngest of five siblings, with two older brothers and two older sisters. His father, Rattan Singh, worked as a bandmaster, and his mother  Meera Singh was a maid. Rahelu has infantile paralysis. He contracted polio when he was eight months old. He is married to Jaswinder Kaur and has two daughters named Ridhima and Ravneet.

Powerlifting
After finishing higher secondary education, Rahelu chose not to continue his education further. He decided to pursue powerlifting following encouragement from his friend Surinder Singh Rana, who himself is a powerlifter. Captain Piara Singh VSM(Vashisht Seva Medalist) was his coach in 1996. He lifted 70 kg on his first bench press attempt and within six months he was able to lift 115 kg. He won his first ever title in powerlifting in 1997 at the Punjab Open Meet. In August 1998, he won National Powerlifting Championship held at Chhindwada in Madhya Pradesh.

Rahelu competed in the 56 kg category at the 2004 Summer Paralympics in Athens, Greece. He finished fourth in the final standings after lifting a total weight of 157.5 kg. However, this position was later upgraded to a third-place after Syrian lifter Youseff Younes Cheikh, bronze medallist of the event, was disqualified due to doping. In doing so, he won the first ever medal for India in the powerlifting event of the Paralympics. In 2006, he was conferred by the President of India the Arjuna Award, India's second highest sporting award.

Rahelu was one of the two Indian competitors at the 2008 Summer Paralympics. He participated in the powerlifting event. He managed to lift a total load of 170 kg putting him at position fifth, behind Polish Mariusz Tomczyk, out of thirteen contenders in the final. Rahelu won silver in 2014 Commonwealth Games, with a total lift of 185 kg.

Occupation
Working as Weightlifitng (Para Powerlifting) Coach in Sports Authority of India at NSWC Gandhinagar, Gujarat.

See also 

India at the Paralympics

References

External links
Profile at london2012.com
Profile at ipc.infostradasports.com

1973 births
Living people
Indian powerlifters
Paralympic powerlifters of India
Powerlifters at the 2004 Summer Paralympics
Powerlifters at the 2008 Summer Paralympics
Powerlifters at the 2012 Summer Paralympics
Paralympic bronze medalists for India
People from Jalandhar district
Weightlifters from Punjab, India
Les Autres category Paralympic competitors
Recipients of the Arjuna Award
Powerlifters at the 2010 Commonwealth Games
Powerlifters at the 2014 Commonwealth Games
Medalists at the 2004 Summer Paralympics
Sportspeople from Jalandhar
Commonwealth Games silver medallists for India
Commonwealth Games medallists in weightlifting
Paralympic medalists in powerlifting
Medallists at the 2014 Commonwealth Games